Thierry Sacco is a French ten-pin bowler. He finished in 12th position of the combined rankings at the 2006 AMF World Cup.

References

Living people
Year of birth missing (living people)
French ten-pin bowling players
Place of birth missing (living people)
21st-century French people